USS Observer is a name used more than once by the U.S. Navy:

 , a coastal minesweeper laid down 6 September 1941.
 , a minesweeper laid down 20 July 1953.

United States Navy ship names